{{DISPLAYTITLE:C14H19NO3}}
The molecular formula C14H19NO3 (molar mass: 249.30 g/mol, exact mass: 249.1365 u) may refer to:

 Dipentylone
 N-Ethylpentylone, or ephylone
 PD-128,907

Molecular formulas